Gabriel "Gabe" Bryan Gardner (born March 18, 1976, in San Diego, California) is an American professional volleyball player. He is a two-time Olympian, having played at the 2004 Athens Olympics and 2008 Beijing Olympics with the U.S. national team.

Gardner graduated from San Clemente High School, where he went on to the University of Southern California, playing for the USC Trojans volleyball team in 1996–97. He then transferred to Stanford University, where due to NCAA transfer rules he sat out the 1998 season before playing for the Cardinal in 1999. Gardner also played water polo as a goalie in addition to being an accomplished volleyball player at the high school level. He is married to Olympic bronze medalist Lauren McFall Gardner, who was the team captain of the 2004 Olympic synchronized swimming team.

References

External links

Official website for Gabe Gardner
 Player profile at fenerbahce.org

1976 births
Living people
American men's volleyball players
Volleyball players at the 2004 Summer Olympics
Volleyball players at the 2008 Summer Olympics
Stanford Cardinal men's volleyball players
USC Trojans men's volleyball players
Volleyball players from San Diego
Fenerbahçe volleyballers
Ural Ufa volleyball players
Medalists at the 2008 Summer Olympics
Olympic gold medalists for the United States in volleyball
Volleyball players at the 2003 Pan American Games
Pan American Games competitors for the United States